IPWA or IPWA Championship may refer to:

 Independent Professional Wrestling Alliance - An American independent professional wrestling promotion that held events in the Mid-Atlantic and Southeastern United States
IPWA Heavyweight Championship (United States)
IPWA Tag Team Championship
IPWA Light Heavyweight Championship
 Israeli Pro Wrestling Association - An independent wrestling promotion, operating from Israel
IPWA Heavyweight Championship (Israel)